Sidnei Sciola Moraes (born February 2, 1986 in Santana de Parnaíba, São Paulo) is a footballer who plays as a winger.

Starting his career in Brazil with Esporte Clube Noroeste and Bandeirante he moved to Portugal in 2008 and played for Boavista FC and Rio Ave. In 2011, he moved to Cyprus where he played for Cypriot First Division club Enosis Neon Paralimni and Alki Larnaca.

References

External links 

Sidnei at Footballdatabase

Living people
1986 births
Brazilian footballers
Brazilian expatriate footballers
Association football forwards
Esporte Clube Noroeste players
União Bandeirante Futebol Clube players
Boavista F.C. players
Rio Ave F.C. players
Perth Glory FC players
Enosis Neon Paralimni FC players
Alki Larnaca FC players
Ethnikos Achna FC players
FC Juárez footballers
Ituano FC players
Omonia Aradippou players
Veranópolis Esporte Clube Recreativo e Cultural players
Primeira Liga players
Cypriot First Division players
Cypriot Second Division players
A-League Men players
Expatriate soccer players in Australia
Expatriate footballers in Cyprus
Expatriate footballers in Mexico
Brazilian expatriate sportspeople in Cyprus
Brazilian expatriate sportspeople in Mexico
Brazilian expatriate sportspeople in Portugal
Brazilian expatriate sportspeople in Australia
Footballers from São Paulo (state)